Chakhmaqlui-ye Sofla (also Romanized as Chakhmāqlū’ī-ye Soflá) is a village in Gejlarat-e Gharbi Rural District of Aras District of Poldasht County, West Azerbaijan province, Iran. At the 2006 National Census, its population was 1,225 in 260 households, when it was in the former Poldasht District of Maku County. The following census in 2011 counted 1,675 people in 379 households, by which time the district had been separated from the county, Poldasht County established, and divided into two districts: the Central and Aras Districts. The latest census in 2016 showed a population of 1,687 people in 395 households; it was the largest village in its rural district.

References 

Poldasht County

Populated places in West Azerbaijan Province

Populated places in Poldasht County